{{Citation needed span|
Life skills-based education (LSBE) is a form of education that focuses on cultivating personal life skills such as self-reflection, critical thinking, problem solving and interpersonal skills.

In 1986, the Ottawa Charter for Health Promotion recognized life skills in terms of making better health choices. The 1989 Convention on the Rights of the Child (CRC)  by stating that education should be directed towards the development of the child’s fullest potential. The 1990 Jomtien Declaration on Education for All took this vision further and included life skills among essential learning tools for survival, capacity development and quality of life. The 2000 Dakar World Education Conference took a position that all young people and adults have the human right to benefit from "an education that includes learning to know, to do, to live together and to be", and included life skills in two out of the six EFA Goals.

Life skills-based education is now recognized as a methodology to address a variety of issues of child and youth development and thematic responses including as expressed in UNGASS on HIV/AIDS (2001), UNGASS on Children (2002), World Youth Report (2003), World Program for Human Rights Education (2004), UN Decade on Education for Sustainable Development (2005), UN Secretary General’s Study on Violence Against Children (2006), 51st Commission on the Status of Women (2007), and the World Development Report (2007).

See also 
 People skills

References
 WHO (1999), Partners in Life Skills Training: Conclusions from a United Nations Inter-Agency Meeting, Geneva 
 WHO (2004), Skills for health : An important entry-point for health promoting/child-friendly schools, Geneva.

Educational programs
Life skills